Skorzeszyce  is a village in the administrative district of Gmina Górno, within Kielce County, Świętokrzyskie Voivodeship, in south-central Poland.

The village has a population of 1,300.

References

Skorzeszyce